WHO fungal priority pathogens are groups of pathogenic fungi that the World Health Organization deems in need of global attention.
 
The list has three priority groups.  In decreasing order of concern, they are:  critical, high, and medium.

Critical group
Cryptococcus neoformans
Candida auris
Aspergillus fumigatus
Candida albicans

High group
Nakaseomyces glabrata (formerly Candida glabrata)
Histoplasma spp.
Histoplasma capsulatum
Histoplasma capsulatum var. capsulatum
Histoplasma capsulatum var. duboisii
Histoplasma capsulatum var. farciminosum
Histoplasma duboisii
Histoplasma muris
eumycetoma causative agents, including:
Acremonium falciform
Acremonium kiliense
Acremonium recifei
Aspergillus flavus
Aspergillus nidulans
Cladophialophora bantiana
Cladophialophora mycetomatis
Curvularia geniculata
Curvularia lunata
Cylindrocarpon cyanescens
Exophiala jeanselmei
Falciformispora senegalensis
Fusarium moniliforme
Fusarium solani
Glenospora clapieri
Leptosphaeria senegalensis
Leptosphaeria tompkinsii
Madurella grisea
Madurella mycetomatis
Microsporum audouinii
Microsporum canis
Neotestudina rosatii
Phaeoacremonium parasiticum
Phialophora cyanescens
Phialophora verrucosa
Pseudoallescheria boydii (Scedosporium apiospermum)
Pyrenochaeta mackinonii
Pyrenochaeta romeroi
Trichophyton rubrum
Zopfia rosatii
Mucorales
includes 13 families, 56 genera, 300 species
Fusarium spp.
see List of Fusarium species
Candida tropicalis
Candida parapsilosis

Medium group
Scedosporium spp., including:
Scedosporium americanum
Scedosporium apiospermum
Scedosporium aurantiacum
Scedosporium boydii
Scedosporium cereisporum
Scedosporium deficiens
Scedosporium dehoogii
Scedosporium desertorum
Scedosporium magalhaesii
Scedosporium minutisporum
Scedosporium prolificans
Scedosporium rarisporum
Scedosporium sanyaense
Lomentospora prolificans
Coccidioides spp., including:
Coccidioides immitis
Coccidioides posadasii
Pichia kudriavzeveii (formerly Candida krusei)
Cryptococcus gattii
Talaromyces marneffei
Pneumocystis jirovecii
Paracoccidioides spp., including:
Paracoccidioides americana
Paracoccidioides brasiliensis
Paracoccidioides cerebriformis
Paracoccidioides ceti
Paracoccidioides lutzii
Paracoccidioides restrepoana
Paracoccidioides venezuelensis

References

Lists of fungi
Lists of diseases
Fungal diseases
World Health Organization